The Waterfall may refer to:

 The Waterfall (album), a 2015 album by American rock band My Morning Jacket
 The Waterfall (film), a 2001 Turkish comedy-drama film, written and directed by Semir Aslanyürek
 The Waterfall (novel), a 1969 novel by British novelist Margaret Drabble

See also
 Waterfall (disambiguation)